Brent LaMar Top (born 1953) is a professor of Church History and Doctrine at Brigham Young University (BYU). Top served as dean of religious education at BYU and the director of BYU's Religious Studies Center from 2013 to 2018.

Biographical background
Top is a native of Idaho Falls.  He served a mission for the Church of Jesus Christ of Latter-day Saints (LDS Church) in Denmark.  He holds a bachelor's degree in history, a master's degree in instructional media and a Ph.D. in instructional science and technology, all from BYU.

Prior to joining the BYU faculty in 1987, Top was both a seminary and an institute instructor in the Church Educational System.  He currently holds an endowed professorship in moral education at BYU.

Among other callings in the LDS Church, Top has served as a bishop, member of a stake presidency, and as president of the Pleasant Grove Utah East Stake.  Top was  president of the church's Peoria Illinois Mission from 2004 to 2007.

Publications
Top has written several books, including Ten Secrets Wise Parents Know: Tried and True Things You Can Do To Raise Faithful, Confident Responsible Children (written with Bruce A. Chadwick), When You Can't Do It Alone and Why Bad Things Happen to Good People.  He has also written articles for such publications as The Elementary School Journal.

Notes

Sources
 
BYU bio
"New mission presidents", Church News, January 24, 2004

1953 births
20th-century Mormon missionaries
21st-century Mormon missionaries
American leaders of the Church of Jesus Christ of Latter-day Saints
American Mormon missionaries in the United States
American Mormon missionaries in Denmark
Brigham Young University alumni
Brigham Young University faculty
Church Educational System instructors
Living people
Mission presidents (LDS Church)
People from Idaho Falls, Idaho
Latter Day Saints from Idaho
Latter Day Saints from Utah